The St. Olaf Lutheran Church in Devils Lake, North Dakota was listed on the National Register of Historic Places in March 2015.

It was designed by Devils Lake architect Joseph A. Shannon in Late Gothic Style and was built in 1930.

The St. Olaf Congregation was organized in 1885, and another congregation merged in 1887.  A wood-frame church was built by 1888 at Sixth St. and Sixth Ave. in Devils Lake.  In 1929 the lot diagonally across was purchased for a new, larger church, and despite the onset of the Great Depression the present church was built during 1930.  An education unit was added in the 1950s and there was another addition in 1987.

References

External links
St. Olaf Lutheran Church, Devils Lake, official site

Churches on the National Register of Historic Places in North Dakota
Gothic Revival architecture in North Dakota
Late Gothic Revival architecture
Churches completed in 1930
National Register of Historic Places in Ramsey County, North Dakota
Lutheran churches in North Dakota
1930 establishments in North Dakota